Pochyta is a genus of African jumping spiders that was first described by Eugène Louis Simon in 1901.

Species
 it contains twelve species, found only in Africa:
Pochyta aurantiaca Wesołowska & Szűts, 2021 – Gabon
Pochyta equatorialis Wesołowska & Szűts, 2021 – Gabon
Pochyta fastibilis Simon, 1903 – Cameroon, Gabon
Pochyta insulana Simon, 1910 – São Tomé and Príncipe
Pochyta konilokho Wesołowska & Szűts, 2021 – Guinea
Pochyta lucida Wesołowska & Szűts, 2021 – Gabon
Pochyta maddisoni Wesołowska & Szűts, 2021 – Gabon
Pochyta major Simon, 1902 – Cameroon, Gabon, Angola
Pochyta minuta Wesołowska & Szűts, 2021 – Nigeria
Pochyta pulchra (Thorell, 1899) – Cameroon, Gabon
Pochyta spinosa Simon, 1901 (type) – Guinea, Sierra Leone, Ghana, Nigeria, Cameroon, Gabon, Mozambique, Madagascar
Pochyta tendicula Wesołowska & Szűts, 2021 – Gabon

References

Salticidae genera
Salticidae
Spiders of Africa